The Veritas RS was a Veritas sports car based on the BMW 328 that also raced in Formula One. It raced in five World Championship Grands Prix; the 1952 Swiss Grand Prix, the 1952 Belgian Grand Prix, the 1952 German Grand Prix, the 1953 Belgian Grand Prix, and the 1953 German Grand Prix. Its best result in Formula One racing was a 7th-place finish at the 1952 German Grand Prix, being driven by Fritz Riess.

History

However, 1949 was also the year in which the Veritas Komet coupé, a road version of the RS, was launched. And furthermore, again in 1949, Veritas was transferred again, this time to Muggensturm, where it abandoned the 2-litre BMW of the 328 to instead use a  engine (to be precise, 1998 cm³), but made by Heinkel. There were 200 orders for motorized Veritas, but poor financial management of the company resulted in 1950, at the end of series car production.

References 

Sports racing cars
Formula One cars
Cars of Germany
1940s cars
1950s cars
1952 Formula One season cars
1953 Formula One season cars